The National Radio and Television Administration (NRTA) is a ministry-level executive agency controlled by the Central Propaganda Department of the Chinese Communist Party (CCP). Its main task is the administration and supervision of state-owned enterprises engaged in the television and radio industries.

It directly controls state-owned enterprises at the national level such as China Central Television, China National Radio, and China Radio International, as well as other movie and television studios and other non-business organizations.

The administration was formerly known as the State Administration of Press, Publication, Radio, Film and Television from 2013 to 2018, and the State Administration of Radio, Film, and Television from 1998 to 2013.

History 
In 1986 the Ministry of Culture Film Bureau and the Ministry of Radio and Television merged to form the Ministry of Radio, Film and Television. On 25 June 1998 the Ministry of Radio, Film and Television reorganized as the State Administration of Radio, Film and Television. In March 2013 the State Council announced plans to merge State Administration of Radio, Film, and Television with the General Administration of Press and Publication to form the State Administration of Press and Publication, Radio, Film, and Television.

In March 2018, the SAPPRFT was abolished and its functions of the movie, press and publication industry regulation were moved from the State Council to the CCP's Central Propaganda Department.

In July 2021, the NRTA entered into an agreement with Russia's Ministry of Digital Development, Communications and Mass Media to cooperate on news coverage and media narratives.

In June 2022, the NRTA and the Ministry of Culture and Tourism of the People's Republic of China issued a code of conduct for online hosts of live streams and podcasts banning any content that "weakens, distorts, or denies the leadership of the CCP."

Technical details 
In its role of providing the physical infrastructure for broadcasting the NRTA plays a similar role in China as TDF Group plays in France, or Crown Castle plays in the US or Australia. It owns and operates, as well as manages many thousands of MW, FM, TV and Shortwave relay transmitters in China (as well as those leased abroad for external broadcasting).

CMMB deployment 
China Multimedia Mobile Broadcasting (CMMB) is a mobile television and multimedia standard developed and specified in China by the State Administration of Radio, Film, and Television (SARFT). It is based on the Satellite and Terrestrial Interactive Multiservice Infrastructure (STiMi), developed by TiMiTech, a company formed by the Chinese Academy of Broadcasting Science. Announced in October 2006, it has been described as being similar to Europe's DVB-SH standard for digital video broadcast from both satellites and terrestrial 'gap fillers' to handheld devices.

It specifies usage of the 2.6 GHz frequency band and occupies 25 MHz bandwidth within which it provides 25 video and 30 radio channels with some additional data channels. Multiple companies have chips that support CMMB standard - Innofidei who was the first with a solution March 28, 2007, Siano Mobile Silicon(with the SMS118x chip family, which support diversity and have superb performance) and more.

Role in regulating film, television, and internet content
The NRTA issues mandatory guidelines for media content. In 2011 and 2012 (when still SARFT) it limited the number of reality television programs and of historical dramas expressing particular disapproval of programs with a plot twist that involved time travel back to a Chinese historical era. This decree resulted in cancellation of a number of planned films with historical drama plots.

It issued a directive on 30 March 2009 to highlight 31 categories of content prohibited online, including violence, pornography, content which may "incite ethnic discrimination or undermine social stability". Some industry observers believe that the move was designed to stop the spread of parodies or other comments on politically sensitive issues in the runup to the anniversary of the 1989 Tiananmen Square protests and massacre.

It issued a directive named "SAPPRFT's Opinions On Strengthening The Programme Management of Satellite Television Channels" in 2011, aiming at over-turning the over-emphasis on purely entertainment programmes in the satellite television channels in China.

Outstanding Domestic Animated Television Productions
For every quarter, the SAPPRFT announces the Outstanding Domestic Animated Television Productions, which is given to the works that "persist with correct value guidance" and "possess relatively high artistic quality and production standards". The initial nominees are selected by the province-level administrative departments of broadcast and television, and the China Central Television (CCTV). Then, the SAPPRFT invites the relevant broadcasting organisations, experts and audience representatives to review the nominees and make the finalist. Once the list is finalised, the television broadcasters in Mainland China, especially nationwide generalist channels and animation and children's channels , and children's channels on terrestrial television, are recommended to give priority when broadcasting such series.

See also

 List of banned films in China
 Censorship in the People's Republic of China
 Film censorship in China

References

External links
 

Government agencies of China
State Council of the People's Republic of China
Mass media in China
Government agencies established in 1998